Skalica District (okres Skalica) is a district in the Trnava Region of western Slovakia. It lies in the northern part of Záhorská nížina, a lowland between Bratislava and Czech Republic. The district was established in 1923 and its current borders have existed from 1996. Its largest town is its seat Skalica.

The main branch of the district's economy is industry.

Important cultural sights are the historical center of the town Skalica and a church in Kopčany, one of the oldest buildings in Slovakia, originating from the Great Moravian period.

Municipalities
Skalica District consists of 18 municipalities; in three of them are towns.

Brodské
Dubovce
Chropov
Gbely
Holíč
Kátov
Kopčany
Koválovec
Letničie
Lopašov
Mokrý Háj
Oreské
Petrova Ves
Popudinské Močidľany
Prietržka
Radimov
Radošovce
Skalica
Trnovec
Unín
Vrádište

References

 
Districts of Slovakia